Paul Edward "Red" Pierce (December 29, 1914 – March 31, 2004) was an American football player and coach. He served two stints as head football coach at Sul Ross State University, from 1946 to 1951 and again from to 1976 to 1977, and one stint at Sam Houston State University, from 1952 to 1967, amassing a career college football record of 143–81–9. His 1964 Sam Houston State Bearkats football team shared the NAIA Football National Championship after tying the Concordia Cobbers in the title game.

Early years
A native of Hill, New Mexico, Pierce grew up in Fort Stockton, Texas, graduating from high school there in 1932. He went on to attend Schreiner Institute (now Schreiner University) in Kerrville, Texas, where he earned his associate of arts degree while playing football, basketball and track. Pierce continued his collegiate career at Sul Ross State Teachers College (now Sul Ross State University) in Alpine, Texas. He participated in varsity football and basketball, and graduated two years later with his Bachelor of Science degree in chemistry. He earned his Ed.D. degree from the University of Houston in 1961.

During World War II, Pierce served as a gunnery officer in the US Navy, and became the head football coach at the United States Naval Training Center Bainbridge in Port Deposit, Maryland near the conclusion of the war.

Coaching career
In 1946 Pierce was hired at his alma mater Sul Ross State to rebuild a football program that was discontinued during the war. He guided the Lobos to 18 consecutive wins, four conference championships and two bowl games, including the 1949 Tangerine Bowl in Orlando, Florida.

In 1952, Pierce became the head football coach, head track coach and athletic director at Sam Houston State. His teams at SHSU tied for four conference championships and played in five bowl games. His 1964 Bearcat team tied Concordia College for a National Association of Intercollegiate Athletics co-championship. In 1965, he was named the Knute Rockne Little All-American Coach of the Year.

He returned to Sul Ross in 1968 as a professor of health and education and chairman of the physical education department. Although better known for his football teams, he had an outstanding record at Sul Ross as the women's volleyball coach. From 1971 to 1975, he directed them to the national tournament three times, won the national championship and placed fifth in the nation twice.

Head coaching record

References

External links
 

1914 births
2004 deaths
Sam Houston Bearkats athletic directors
Sam Houston Bearkats football coaches
Schreiner Mountaineers football players
Sul Ross Lobos football coaches
Sul Ross Lobos football players
United States Navy personnel of World War II
United States Navy officers
University of Houston alumni
People from Doña Ana County, New Mexico
People from Fort Stockton, Texas
Players of American football from Texas
Military personnel from Texas